Samuel MacCurdy Greer (1810–1880), was an Irish politician who, in Ulster championed Presbyterian representation and tenant rights. He was a founder member of the Ulster Tenant Right Association and of the all-Ireland Tenant Right League. In the general election of 1857 he was returned to Westminster on a tenant-right platform for County Londonderry.

Background
Samuel MacCurdy Greer was the eldest son of the Rev. Thomas Greer, Presbyterian minister of Dunboe, and Elizabeth Caldwell, daughter of Captain Adam Caldwell, R.N. He was born at Springvale near Castlerock, County Londonderry, in 1810, educated at the Belfast Academy and Glasgow University, and was called to the Irish Bar in 1833.

Tenant righter
Greer entered public life in the wake of the Great Irish Famine which, together with a drop in agricultural prices, compounded the poverty and insecurity of tenant farmers.  With James MacKnight, editor of the Londonderry Standard, William Sharman Crawford MP, a progressive County Down landlord, and group of radical Presbyterian ministers, in 1847 Greer formed the Ulster Tenant Right Association. The association called for rent reductions, and for the codification of the Ulster tenant right, the customary understanding that gave tenants a saleable interest in the land they had worked.

When Downhill Castle, owned by the Tory landlord Sir Harvey Bruce, was burned down in a malicious fire, Greer made a name for himself by waging a successful legal campaign against the attempt of the landlord-controlled county Grand Jury to place the cost of its rebuilding on the local taxpayer. He was invited to share platforms with MacKnight and to join in a delegation to London to press the case for rent controls.

In 1850, Greer accepted Charles Gavan Duffy's invitation to form an all-Ireland Tenant Right League. This was to bring Ulster tenant righters into what proved an uneasy alliance with southern tenant protection societies and with prominent supporters, like Duffy, of a restored and reformed (and perforce Catholic-majority) Irish Parliament.

Radical and Liberal Party politician
In the 1852 Westminster election Greer stood on the tenant right platform. But in the face of organised, sometimes violent Orange opposition, Duffy's promised "League of North and South" failed to deliver. Of the 48 League-supported MPs returned to Westminster as the Independent Irish Party (many of them sitting Repeal MPs), only one represented an Ulster constituency, William Kirk for Newry. In the south, the clericalist Catholic Defence Association further split the movement.  Politically isolated, in 1856 Duffy took his commitment to land reform to Australia.

While supportive of the legislative union with Great Britain, Greer was not prepared to enter into the pan-Protestant unionist alliance urged by the sometime Presbyterian Moderator, Henry Cooke. Too many Anglicans insisted on the prerogatives not only of landlords, but also of their Established Church the costs of which, borne by landowners, were passed to the tenant in higher rents.

When in 1857 Greer next stood on a tenant-right platform in County Londonderry it was in a by-election for the Presbyterian Representation Society formed, over the objections of Cooke, to "secure Parliamentary representation, and a recognition of their claims to public offices and appointments, for the Presbyterians of Ireland."

Supported by MacKnight, Greer was successful in taking one of the county's two seats in the general election later the same year as a Radical. In Britain, the Radical leader John Bright had, at the outset, endorsed the League's tenant right  programme. With even Orangemen supporting the tenant right (forty were expelled from the Order for declaring for Greer in then still open balloting) he edged out the Tory Sir Harvey Bruce, 2,339 votes to 1,676. Two years later, standing for the Liberal Party (a United Kingdom union of the Radicals, Whigs and the anti-protectionist Tory Peelites) his vote dropped from a third to a quarter of the ballot, and the Conservatives regained both seats. His loss to the Tory landlord-nominee James Johnston Clark led to the withdrawal of many Presbyterians from politics.

In 1860 in by-election for the Derry City seat, Greer tried to succeed the Whig MP Sir Robert Ferguson, but the Conservative candidate William McCormick, who employed a significant number of Catholic workers, managed to split the Catholic vote and defeated Greer with a majority of 19.

Although failing to win office as a Liberal, Greer promoted the party in Ulster. It was the vehicle through the first of the Irish Land Acts was secured in 1870. This met one of the central demands of the Ulster Tenant Right Association. It gave the Custom of Ulster, which restricted the opportunity to rack-rent tenant improvements, the force of law. In 1872, the Gladstone administration also introduced the secret ballot, which reduced the intimidatory power of landlords and employers.

In 1870 Greer accepted the recordership of Londonderry, an office until 1878, when he was appointed county court judge of Cavan and Leitrim. He died in 1880.

References

External links 
 

19th-century Irish politicians
1810 births
1880 deaths
Irish Presbyterians
People from County Londonderry
Alumni of the University of Glasgow
Members of the Parliament of the United Kingdom for County Londonderry constituencies (1801–1922)
UK MPs 1857–1859
People educated at the Belfast Royal Academy
Irish County Court judges